The Rose Street drill hall is a former military installation in Inverness, Scotland.

History
The building was designed as the headquarters of the 4th Battalion, the Queen's Own Cameron Highlanders and was completed about 1908. The battalion was mobilised at the drill hall in August 1914 before being deployed to the Western Front. At that time the building was also the drill hall for two sections of the Highland Mounted Brigade Field Ambulances, Royal Army Medical Corps.
 
After the Second World War the 4th Battalion amalgamated with the 5th Battalion to for the 4th/5th Battalion with its headquarters still at the Rose Street drill hall. However, after the battalion was disbanded in 1967, the drill hall was decommissioned and converted for retail use and is currently operated as a bar and as a hostel.

References

Drill halls in Scotland
Buildings and structures in Inverness